The EMP2 (Efficient Modular Platform) is a modular car platform which is jointly developed and used by French car manufacturer PSA Group (merged into Stellantis since 2021) for compact and mid-size cars with front wheel drive or four wheel drive and transverse engine. It replaces the PF2 and PF3 platforms in one combined modular platform, and cost PSA €630 million to develop.

Specification
The EMP2 platform is highly modular, with a choice of short and long wheelbase, low or high riding height, and a choice of independent multi-link or twisted-beam rear suspension. Comparing to the predecessor PF2, the platform reduces the weight by 70 kg using very high strength steel, aluminum and magnesium alloys, and composite materials.

The first vehicles to use the platform are the 2013 Citroën C4 Picasso (second generation), and the Peugeot 308 (second generation).

The later iteration of the EMP2 has a degree of flexibility which allows four different track widths, five different wheelbase lengths, two different cockpit architectures, two rear axle architectures, several rear vehicle modules for various versions (short, long, five or seven-seater, single seats or rear bench, combustion engine or hybrid), and up to six different rear vehicle assemblies, which can be produced on the same assembly line.

Production
PSA started production of the EMP2 platform at the Vigo plant (in Spain), under the 2013 Citroën C4 Picasso which was previewed by the Technospace concept car, and the 2013 Peugeot 308, which is produced in the Sochaux plant in France.

Vehicles based on EMP2 platform

EMP2 V1 

The EMP2 V1 is the first iteration of the EMP2 platform, which debuted in 2013 with the second-generation Citroën C4 Picasso and the second-generation Peugeot 308.

 Citroën C4 Picasso/Spacetourer II (3D, 2013–2020)
 Citroën Grand C4 Picasso/Spacetourer II (3A/3E, 2013–2022)
 Citroën C6 II (X81, 2016–present)
 Dongfeng Fengshen/Aeolus A9 (2016–2019)
 Peugeot 308 II (T9, 2013–2021)
 Peugeot 408 II (T9, 2014–present)

EMP2 V2 

The EMP2 V2 is the second iteration of the EMP2 platform, which debuted in 2016. The V2 supports mild hybrid and plug-in hybrid powertrains.

V2.1 

 Citroën C5 Aircross (2017–present)
 DS 7 Crossback (X74, 2017–present)
 Opel Grandland (2017–present)
 Peugeot 3008/4008 II (P84, 2017–present)
 Peugeot 5008 II (T87, 2017–present)

V2.3 

 DS 9 (X83, 2020–present)
 Peugeot 508 II (R82/R83, 2018–present)

EMP2 V3 

The EMP2 V3 is the third iteration of the EMP2 platform, which debuted with the second-generation DS 4. The improved platform introduced 70 percent new components compared to the previous iteration. It supports mild hybrid, plug-in hybrid and battery electric powertrains.

 Citroën C5 X (E43, 2021–present)
 DS 4 II (D41, 2021–present)
 Opel Astra L (OV51/OV52, 2021–present)
 Peugeot 308 III (P51/P52, 2021–present)
 Peugeot 408 (P54, 2022–present)

eVMP

Opel Astra-e L (OV51/OV52, 2022–present)
 Peugeot e-308 III (P51/P52, 2022–present)

Modified platform 

 Citroën Berlingo III (K9, 2018–present; the front end adopted the EMP2 while the rear section is derived from the previous generation)
 Peugeot Partner (2018–present)
 Peugeot Rifter (2018–present)
 Opel/Vauxhall Combo (2018–present)
 Vauxhall Combo (2018–present)
 Toyota ProAce City (2019–present)
 Fiat Doblò (2022–present)

Unspecified 

 Citroën Jumpy III (2016–present)
 Citroën Dispatch (2016–present)
 Citroën SpaceTourer (2016–present)
 Peugeot Expert (2016–present)
 Peugeot Traveller (2016–present)
 Toyota ProAce (2016–present)
 Toyota ProAce Verso (2016–present)
 Opel/Vauxhall Vivaro (2019–present)
 Opel Zafira Life (2019–present)
 Fiat Scudo (2022–present)
 Fiat Ulysse (2022–present)

See also 

 List of Stellantis platforms
 List of PSA platforms
 List of Fiat platforms

References

PSA platforms